The Episcopal Diocese of Lexington is the diocese of The Episcopal Church with jurisdiction over eastern Kentucky. It was created in 1895 from the Diocese of Kentucky which continues to have jurisdiction of the western portion of the state. The cathedral for the Diocese of Kentucky is located in Louisville. The Diocese of Lexington is in Province 4 and its cathedral, Christ Church Cathedral, is in Lexington, as are the diocesan offices. The diocesan office is called Mission House.

The diocese's greatest membership strength is in the Bluegrass region in and around Lexington, with a smaller pocket of strength in the Northern Kentucky suburbs of Cincinnati. The diocese has only a few congregations in the Appalachian portion of the southeastern corner of the state.

Bishops of Lexington

Current Bishop
The Rt. Rev. Mark Van Koevering was consecrated as Bishop of Niassa, Mozambique, part of the Anglican Church of Southern Africa, in 2003, where he served until November 2015. In November 2015, he moved back to the United States, to become the assistant bishop at the Episcopal Diocese of West Virginia. He served there until April 2018 when he became the provisional bishop of the Diocese of Lexington. He became eligible to be the diocesan bishop after a period of shared ministry, prayer, and review. On 1 November 2019 at a special convention of the diocese, Bishop Van Koevering was elected diocesan bishop. Pending the required consents, he will be seated at Christ Church Cathedral, Lexington in the coming months.

Departure of Bishop Hahn and call of Bishop Caldwell
Bruce Edward Caldwell was called to serve as Bishop Provisional on June 1, 2016. He was named to the temporary post after his predecessor, the Rt. Rev. Douglas Hahn, was suspended and later resigned after it was learned he had lied during the bishop search process about past adultery with a parishioner.

List of parishes and locations

In addition to these parishes and missions, there are other ministries of the Dioceses that have attached chapels. The college ministry at the University of Kentucky is located at St. Augustine's Chapel in Lexington. St. Agnes' House in Lexington was "a nonprofit, ecumenical mission providing economical lodging for patients and their caregivers who have traveled to Lexington, Kentucky seeking treatment for serious illnesses at area hospitals and other medical care facilities." St. Agnes' House closed in 2017.

The Diocese of Lexington also has a co-cathedral located at the diocesan camp and conference center, The Cathedral Domain, in Lee County. It is called the Cathedral of St. George the Martyr.

The diocese also supports a literacy ministry called Reading Camp. Reading Camp is a Free week-long camp for kids going into third, fourth or fifth grade who could use extra help with reading. Reading Camp builds both reading skills and self-confidence!

See also

 List of Succession of Bishops for the Episcopal Church, USA

References

External links
Episcopal Diocese of Lexington website
Christ Church Cathedral, Lexington
Official Web site of the Episcopal Church
Journal of the Annual Convention, Diocese of Lexington

1895 establishments in Kentucky
Anglican dioceses established in the 19th century
Lexington
Episcopal Church in Kentucky
Province 4 of the Episcopal Church (United States)
Religious organizations established in 1895